The Dinira National Park is a protected area with the national park status located between the states Lara, Portuguesa and Trujillo in the South American country of Venezuela. It was created on November 30, 1988.

It was created in order to protect the upper basin of the Tocuyo River. In total there are five basins, Orinoco, Guanare, Motatán, and Lake Maracaibo, including the Tocuyo River.

It has an area of 45,328 hectares of mountainous relief in whose entrails are born in addition to the river Tocuyo, numerous streams of water of regional importance. This motivated the natives who populated it to call it Dinira, because its waters feed other currents below. It can rain up to 1,300 mm annually.

Gallery

See also
List of national parks of Venezuela
Morrocoy National Park

References

National parks of Venezuela
Protected areas established in 1988
Geography of Lara (state)
Tourist attractions in Lara (state)
1988 establishments in Venezuela
Geography of Portuguesa (state)
Tourist attractions in Portuguesa (state)
Geography of Trujillo (state)
Tourist attractions in Trujillo (state)